Zövnə (also, Zevna and Zovna) is a village and municipality in the Lerik Rayon of Azerbaijan.  It has a population of 348.

References 

Populated places in Lerik District